KUFM (89.1 FM) is a radio station licensed to Missoula, Montana. The station is owned by the University of Montana, and serves as the flagship station of Montana Public Radio.

History
Montana Public Radio began on January 31, 1965, when KUFM in Missoula signed on as a 10-watt campus radio station. In 1974, it became a charter member of National Public Radio.

Starting in the late 1970s, it began building translators across western Montana.  Its first full-power satellite, in Great Falls, signed on in 1984.  In 1999, a signal extension project funded mostly by a federal grant made it possible to sign on new stations in Kalispell and Hamilton and upgrade translators in Butte and Helena to full-power stations.

Translators
KUFM also utilizes three translators.

External links

UFM
NPR member stations
Radio stations established in 1965
Montana Public Radio
1965 establishments in Montana